The Luchaire Affaire is a French is a politico-financial scandal which happened in the 1980s, under the François Mitterrand presidency.

The facts
Between 1982 and 1986, while Charles Hernu was the French Minister of Defence, France supplied shells to Iran. This was allowed by a French commission because of a fake mentioning other countries rather than Iran. This affair was revealed by the Presse de la Manche newsparer, then by a report by the Contrôle général des armées published by L'Express in January 1987.
Furthermore, 3 millions of francs in kicknack might have given back to the French Socialist Party.

This affair is revealed by the Presse de la Manche newsparer, then by a report by the Contrôle général des armées Jean-François Barba, published by L'Express in January 1987.

The investigation
A formal investigation is judge is put in charge of the judge Michel Legrand. But Jean-François Barba withdraws his allegations and the judge can not obtain any classified documents to pursue his investigation. Prosecutor Pierre Bézard, against the judge legal advice and under a direct written order from the French Ministry of Justice, orders a dismissal of the case which is acted on 16 June 1989.

Aftermath
After this scandal, the first transparency of public life law was voted: it defined the state funding of political parties, and made mandatory for some public servants to publish their financial status. It ultimately led in 2013 to the creation of the Haute Autorité pour la transparence de la vie publique.

References

Political scandals in France